In the Shadow of Women is a 2015 French-Swiss drama film directed by Philippe Garrel, starring Clotilde Courau, Stanislas Merhar, and Lena Paugam. It was selected to open the Directors' Fortnight section at the 2015 Cannes Film Festival. It is the second installment in Garrel's trilogy of love, the first being Jealousy (2013) and the third being Lover for a Day (2017).

Plot
A filmmaker Pierre is working on a documentary film about the French Resistance. He is married to Manon. However, he encounters Elisabeth, an intern at a film archive, and has an affair with her.

Cast

Release
The film had its world premiere as the opening film of the Directors' Fortnight section at the 2015 Cannes Film Festival on 14 May 2015. It was released in France on 27 May 2015.

Reception

Critical response
On review aggregator website Rotten Tomatoes, the film holds an 87% approval rating, based on 38 reviews, with an average score of 7.4/10. On Metacritic, the film received an average score of 74, based on 14 reviews, indicating "generally favorable reviews".

Eric Kohn of IndieWire gave the film a grade of B−, saying, "with its luscious 35mm photography and playful depiction of passionate lovers reaching a breaking point, the swift 72-minute drama delivers a satisfying riff on moody, intimate material Garrel has mined to richer effect many times before." Scott Foundas of Variety described it as "a tightly focused romantic drama that exudes the narrative terseness of a good short story and the lucid craftsmanship of a filmmaker in full command of the medium."

Cahiers du cinéma ranked it as the third best film of 2015.

Accolades

References

External links
 

2015 films
2015 drama films
French drama films
Swiss drama films
2010s French-language films
French black-and-white films
Swiss black-and-white films
Films directed by Philippe Garrel
French-language Swiss films
2010s French films